The Yakima Bears were a minor league baseball team in the northwest United States, located in Yakima, Washington. The Bears competed at the Class A Short Season level as members of the Northwest League from 1990 to 2012. Following the 2012 season, the franchise relocated to Hillsboro, Oregon, and became Hillsboro Hops.

History
After 23 summers without minor league baseball, Yakima returned to the Northwest League in 1990. The Salem Dodgers moved from Salem after the 1989 season, bringing with them their affiliation with the Los Angeles Dodgers. 

In 2001, the Bears changed their affiliation to the Arizona Diamondbacks.

Relocation to Hillsboro
The Yakima Bears had been frustrated by the lack of progress on a new stadium that would meet minor league standards, and a declining local economy. The Triple-A Portland Beavers of the Pacific Coast League had departed for Tucson after the 2010 season, so the Portland metropolitan area was without minor league baseball. In 2011, the city of Vancouver, Washington, presented a proposal on May 13 for a new ballpark to be built on the Clark College campus, ready to host the Yakima Bears franchise for the 2012 season.

After that deal fell through, the team received an offer sheet from Hillsboro, a suburb west of Portland, in June 2012 with plans to start play there in a new ballpark in 2013. Four months later on October 16, the team announced its upcoming move to Hillsboro and was renamed the Hillsboro Hops for the 2013 season. The Hops proceeded to win the 2014 and 2015 Northwest League championships.

The Bears were replaced one year later with the formation of the Yakima Valley Pippins of the West Coast League.

Early Yakima Baseball
The history of baseball in Yakima stretches back  to 1920 with the short-lived Yakima Indians in  the Class B Pacific Coast International League.  The Indians lasted only two seasons, closing in 1921 as the league became the Western International League in 1922.

Yakima entered the WIL in 1937 as the Yakima Pippins, reflecting the local area's apple-growing heritage, lasting until the 1941 season due to World War II.  In 1946, as the WIL resumed play, Yakima again fielded a team, this time named the Yakima Stars, with their own team airplane.  Renaming themselves the Yakima Packers for the 1948 season, the team finally settled on the Yakima Bears in 1949, lasting through the reformation of the WIL into the Northwest League, as the Bears became a charter member of the seven-team Class B NWL in the 1955 season. The team played at Parker Field, constructed in 1937 for the Pippins.

The Bears' time in the early years of the NWL were fruitful, as they won six league titles in nine years (1956, 1958, 1959, 1960, 1963, and 1964). A fire in March 1962 destroyed the wooden grandstand at Parker Field, which was quickly rebuilt. In April 1964, the team was renamed the Yakima Braves, due to an agreement with the Milwaukee Braves, their parent club since 1958. The team played as the Braves for three seasons, through 1966.
The 1966 season was the first for the NWL as a short season league.

Ballparks
The Bears played at Yakima County Stadium. The park still is in use today, located at 1220 Pacific Avenue, Yakima, Washington. The stadium remains in use today and is the current home of the Yakima Pippins of the West Coast League. Prior to 1993 the Bears  played at Parker Field, located at 1000 S. 12th Avenue.

Season-by-season record

Notable ex-Bears 

 Pedro Astacio – 14-year MLB pitcher
 Dick Barrett - MLB pitcher, member of Pacific Coast League Hall of Fame
 Peter Bergeron – outfielder for Montreal Expos
 Pete Coscarart – infielder for Brooklyn Dodgers and Pittsburgh Pirates, 1941 All-Star, 1941 World Series, Brooklyn Dodgers HOF
 Matt Davidson - third baseman with Chicago White Sox
 Ryan Doherty - beach volleyball professional who played three seasons of minor league baseball in Diamondbacks system
 Wayne Franklin - MLB pitcher 2000-06
 Carlos Gonzalez – Colorado Rockies outfielder, 2010 NL batting champion, 3-time All-Star
 Matt Herges – 10-year MLB pitcher
 Koyie Hill – MLB catcher 2003-14
 Todd Hollandsworth – Rookie of the Year outfielder for Los Angeles Dodgers
 Ender Inciarte - All-Star outfielder for Atlanta Braves
 Conor Jackson – Arizona Diamondbacks first baseman
 Paul Konerko – Chicago White Sox first baseman, 6-time All-Star, 2005 World Series champion
 Ted Lilly – 14-year MLB pitcher, 2-time All-Star
 Wade Miley – Baltimore Orioles pitcher
 Scott Proctor – pitcher for three MLB teams
 Jason Repko – outfielder for three MLB teams
 Mark Reynolds – first baseman for Colorado Rockies
 Damian Rolls – MLB third baseman drafted by Los Angeles Dodgers
 David Ross - World Series Champion with Chicago Cubs and Boston Redsox 
 Chad Tracy – 10-year MLB third baseman
 Dan Uggla – MLB second baseman 2006-15, three-time All-Star
 Shane Victorino – MLB outfielder 2003-15, two-time World Series champion

References

External links
Hillsboro Hops – Yakima Bears history
Baseball Reference – Yakima teams
FutureBacks.com: In-Depth coverage of the Yakima Bears

Baseball teams established in 1990
Baseball teams disestablished in 2012
Defunct Northwest League teams
Arizona Diamondbacks minor league affiliates
Los Angeles Dodgers minor league affiliates
Professional baseball teams in Washington (state)
1990 establishments in Washington (state)
2012 disestablishments in Washington (state)